Macaria ribearia, the currant spanworm, is a species of geometrid moth in the family Geometridae. It is found in North America.

The MONA or Hodges number for Macaria ribearia is 6274.

References

External links

 

Macariini
Articles created by Qbugbot
Moths described in 1848